Noeeta hemiradiata is a species of tephritid or fruit flies in the genus Noeeta of the family Tephritidae.

Distribution
Spain.

References

Tephritinae
Insects described in 1991
Diptera of Europe